Edin Sprečo (19 April 1947 – 12 May 2020) was a Bosnian professional footballer who played as a winger.

Club career
Born in Sarajevo, SFR Yugoslavia, present day Bosnia and Herzegovina, Sprečo started playing football for the youth team of hometown club Željezničar when he was 12. At the age of 17, he made his debut for the first team. Sprečo scored two goals in his first game and it was clear that he would become a great player.

He played 199 league games and scored 61 goals for Željezničar. In total, Sprečo played in 234 games and managed to score 75 goals. He was a member of the Željezničar team that won the Yugoslav First League title in the 1971–72 season. In 1975, Sprečo turned 28 and he was allowed to go abroad, as it was prohibited for under-28 players to leave the domestic clubs at the time. He went to Dutch Eredivisie club NAC Breda. He played in Holland alongside compatriots Miroslav Vardić and Nikola Budišić, finishing in 11th place in the Eredivisie.

He also played for, at the time, French Ligue 2 club Rennes making his debut against AS Brestoise on 8 January 1978. Sprečo finished his career at the age of 34 in 1981, while playing for Iskra Bugojno.

International career
Sprečo earned 3 caps for the Yugoslavia national team and also scored two goals while playing for the national team from 1967 to 1969. He scored his first goal for Yugoslavia on 12 November 1967, in a 4–0 win against Albania in a UEFA Euro 1968 qualifying match. His final international was a June 1969 World Cup qualification match away against Finland.

Career statistics

Club
Source:

International
Source:

International goals

Death
Sprečo died at the age of 73 in his hometown of Sarajevo, Bosnia and Herzegovina on 12 May 2020.

Honours

Player
Željezničar 
Yugoslav First League: 1971–72

References

External links
Profile - Reprezentacija
Edin Sprečo at football database.eu

1947 births
2020 deaths
Footballers from Sarajevo
Association football forwards
Yugoslav footballers
Yugoslavia international footballers
FK Željezničar Sarajevo players
NAC Breda players
Stade Rennais F.C. players
NK Iskra Bugojno players
Yugoslav First League players
Eredivisie players
Ligue 2 players
Yugoslav Second League players
Yugoslav expatriate footballers
Expatriate footballers in the Netherlands
Yugoslav expatriate sportspeople in the Netherlands
Expatriate footballers in France
Yugoslav expatriate sportspeople in France